Marjorie Bernardine Castelo Barretto (born 19 May 1974) is a Filipino former actress and politician. She was elected to the city councilor as representative of second district of Caloocan from 2007 to 2013. Her sisters, Claudine and Gretchen Barretto, and her daughter Julia are also actresses.

Personal life
Barretto has 5 children: one with Kier Legaspi, three including actress Julia Francesca with ex-husband Dennis Padilla, and one with former Caloocan Mayor Recom Echiverri

Filmography

Film

Television

References

External links
The Official Website of Marjorie Barretto
 

1974 births
Living people
Marjorie
Filipino film actresses
Filipino television actresses
Filipino television personalities
De La Salle University alumni
People from Iloilo
People from Caloocan
Actresses from Metro Manila
Metro Manila city and municipal councilors
Visayan people
Filipino actor-politicians